Ab Bidak may refer to:
 Ab Bidak, Chaharmahal and Bakhtiari
 Ab Bidak, Kohgiluyeh and Boyer-Ahmad
 Ab Bidak, Fars